S. Ganeshamoorthy of Sri Lanka was a former MP & Deputy Minister of Ethnic affairs, National Integration & Mineral Resources. He is a strong Tamil person in the east. He contested in the 2000 General election and was able to secure a seat in Batticaloa District. The majority of the district development occurred during his political period.

References

External links
priu.gov.lk
sundaytimes.lk
 Udayakumar, brother of ruling SLFP Batticaloa organiser Ganeshamoorthy was shot dead at Kaluwanchikudy
island.lk

Sri Lankan Tamil politicians
Living people
Year of birth missing (living people)